WCMU-TV (channel 14) is a PBS member television station in Mount Pleasant, Michigan, United States, owned by Central Michigan University.

WCMU-TV operates three satellite stations: WCMW (channel 21) in Manistee (with transmitter northeast of Ludington), WCMV (channel 27) in Cadillac (with transmitter east of Kalkaska), and WCML (channel 6) in Alpena (with transmitter north of Atlanta, Michigan). Collectively branded as WCMU Public Media, the four stations cover an area spanning three television markets and small portions of several others.

Although Mount Pleasant is part of the Flint–Saginaw–Bay City market, the majority of WCMU Public Media's viewership is in the Traverse City–Cadillac and Alpena markets.

Satellite stations

WCMU-TV was previously relayed on W46AD in Traverse City and W69AV in Leland; however, the transmitters ceased operations before their licenses were canceled by the FCC on September 7, 2011.

WCML once carried the -TV suffix.

History

WCMU came to the air on March 29, 1967.

In January 2010, WCMU-TV began airing 24 hours a day, and launched an HD feed.

Acquisition of WFUM
On October 27, 2009, it was announced that the CMU Board of Trustees approved a proposal for CMU to acquire Flint, Michigan's PBS member station, WFUM (later WCMZ-TV), from the University of Michigan–Flint for a maximum of $1 million. The sale was approved by the FCC, allowing the network's presence to expand further south, not only including Flint, but also Ann Arbor and into Metro Detroit. The network provided at least secondary over-the-air coverage from far Northern Emmet County to northern Monroe County. While WFUM was folded into the CMU Public Television network, CMU vowed to include Flint-area events and issues in its programming, as well as produce new programming that would originate from the region. CMU believed the acquisition of WFUM will increase its viewership from 2.2 million to 8 million. CMU originally hinted that the takeover of WFUM would begin in late November, but WCMU took over operations of WFUM on January 15, 2010. The FCC approved the sale of WFUM in March and CMU officially took over in May at which point the call letters were changed to WCMZ-TV.

On February 8, 2017, Central Michigan University announced it will sell WCMZ-TV in the FCC spectrum auction for $14 million, claiming its viewers are already able to watch PBS on other nearby affiliates, namely Delta College's WDCQ-TV. It signed off on April 23, 2018.

Technical information

Subchannels
The stations' digital signals are multiplexed:

The entire network discontinued analog service on March 31, 2009.

Unlike other major stations in the Traverse City/Cadillac/Sault Ste. Marie market, CMU Public Television does not have marketwide coverage. Following the 2009 digital transition, the network lost significant coverage. WCML decently penetrated most of the Eastern Upper Peninsula before the analog shutdown. With the switch to digital, residents of the Eastern Upper Peninsula (except for those on the Lake Huron shoreline) were no longer able to receive WCML due to its 300 kW UHF signal. Currently, WCMU Public Media has no plans to add transmitters in the Eastern U.P. All PBS service, whether from CMU Public Television or another station, is available in that region only via cable or satellite. Some cable systems in that region carry another PBS station instead of WCMU — in Sault Ste. Marie, Michigan, Marquette's WNMU is seen on Charter, while across the locks in Sault Ste. Marie, Ontario, Shaw carries Detroit's WTVS instead mainly because of the lack of a local over-the-air signal to the nearly 90,000 people in the twin Saults and Eastern U.P. (Shaw previously carried WNMU for that same reason before it was replaced by WTVS in 2002.)

References

External links
WCMU

PBS member stations
Central Michigan University
Television channels and stations established in 1967
1967 establishments in Michigan
CMU-TV